The Golden Path is a 30-episode drama serial. Set in 1982 and spanning 25 years, it tells the story of a family embroiled in conflicts of interest, webs of deceit, love, hatred and vengeance. The drama was produced by MediaCorp in celebration of the company's 25 years of local Chinese drama production and incorporates scenes from past dramas such as The Seletar Robbery, The Flying Fish, Pretty Faces, Turn of the Tide, Finishing Lines, The Last Applause, Stepping Out, The Golden Pillow and Holland V. The serial was telecast on MediaCorp TV Channel 8, from 11 December 2007, weekdays at 9:00pm. The series finale aired on 21 January 2008.

Meaning of title
As the series revolves around the pursuit of wealth (or at the very least, basic financial stability), the series was named to reflect that. Coincidentally, and perhaps intentionally, the first two characters of the Chinese title, "黄" and "金", are the surnames of the two main families in the series. In that sense, the title would mean "The path travelled by the Huangs and the Jins".

Cast

Huang Family

First generation

Second generation

Jin Family

First generation

Second generation

Other characters

1982 Era

1995 era

2003 era

Synopsis

1982

Introduction
The series began in Chinatown in 1982, where Xiao-gu, a young widow with 3 children (Kaida, Kaijie, and Kaiqi), opened and operated the "Happy Restaurant" (幸福飯店) roadside stall. Xiao-gu is an optimistic woman, even after the death of her husband (along with the none-too-friendly taunts she regularly receives for being a widow) and her tight financial situation.

One night, Xiao-gu received a visit from a young man (Jinlong), who was sent by a dying man to give Xiao-gu a key. The dying man, as it turned out, was Ah Chen, a triad member who helped Xiao-gu when Xiao-gu's husband, Ah Shun, was dying from a grave illness. It later transpired that Ah Cheng was killed by fellow triad member named "Ah She" (pronounced "sher", meaning "Snake", who, in turn, was having an affair with Chen-ge's wife, Chen-sao), with Kaijie and the young man who gave Xiao-gu the key as witnesses. When "Snake" and Chen-sao discovered Xiao-gu's knowledge about the events, in addition to the key Xiao-gu received, they attempted to kill her and Kaijie, but the attempt was thwarted by a mysterious man. "Snake" gave up on his murder attempts, but kidnapped Kaijie to force Xiao-gu to give up the key she received. The key, as it turned out, led to a cashbox that was stashed in an abandoned house. The safe contained tens of thousands of dollars in cash. When "Snake" and Cheng-sao opened the safe and emptied its contents, "Snake" doused the house with petrol, in order to kill Xiao-gu and Kaijie, and silence the only witness to Snake's murderous deeds.

As fire raced through the house, Xiao-gu and Kaijie were able to escape, but Cheng-sao and Snake were still inside. Xiao-gu reentered the house to save Chen-sao, but Snake was burnt to death when burning pillars fell on him.

New Neighbours, New Terrors
As Xiao-gu and Kaijie recover from that traumatic episode, a new neighbour moved into the flat that Xiao-gu rented. Little did Xiao-gu know that her new neighbors were the young man who delivered her the key to Ah Cheng's safe - Jinlong, and his father, Ah Jin - the man who saved Xiao-gu from certain death by "Snake". As the new family settled in, Ah Jin used the money he earned (from sailing, as Ah Jin claimed) to buy his children clothes, blankets, and a television set (considered a luxury to people of their social class during that time). Ah Jin shared his new television set with his neighbours, whose children were mesmerised by it.

Meanwhile, word of mouth began to spread on information about a rapist terrorizing Chinatown. The rapist, who covers himself in motor oil, renders his victims defenceless and unable to resist, thus earning him the title "Oily Man". Xiao-gu made light of the situation at first, thinking it was merely an urban legend, until she was attacked by the Oily Man. Luckily, Ah Jin was in the flat when it happened, and stopped the Oily Man from raping Xiao-gu. Jinlong, on his father's orders, went after the Oily Man. Jinlong subsequently discovered Oily Man's true identity. Oily Man was, in fact, Ah Lin, the timid co-owner (along with his gossipmonger wife, Ah Ying) of a wanton store next to Xiao-gu's restaurant. Jinlong went on to extort money from Ah Lin, with a threat of revealing the truth behind Oily Man to everyone. When Ah Lin failed to produce the money, Jinlong exerted more and more pressure, until Ah Lin lost his temper, and chased Jinlong, Jinfeng (Jinlong's sister), and Kaijie across Chinatown with a chopper, threatening to kill them all. Afterwards, Ah Lin was arrested by Lao Cai, a police officer who lives and patrols in the area, and sent to a mental facility.

Revelations
As time goes by, Ah Jin and his family were settling well into their new surroundings, but Ah Jin's past began to unravel. Contrary to Ah Jin's claim that he is a sailor, Ah Jin was, in fact, a criminal who, along with two accomplices, robbed a jewelry store. One of the accomplice, despite Ah Jin's efforts to save him, was shot dead in the midst of the escape, and a third accomplice successfully fled the scene with  Jin. Ah Jin, along with his surviving accomplice, buried their loot in an undisclosed location. Finally, Ah Jin's secret came out in subtle ways, which led to Kaijie knowing about this dark secret. In the meantime, Xiao-gu and Ah Jin began to grow closer together everyday, and decided to marry each other.

This came, of course, to the extreme displeasure of Kaijie, who did not fancy having a criminal stepfather. To stop the marriage, Kaijie collaborated with Ah Ying, and called the police on Ah Jin. As Ah Jin and Xiao-gu completed their marriage ceremony and exchanged their vows, police surrounded Xiao-gu's flat, and forced Ah Jin to escape. Before Ah Jin went on the run, he held Ah Cai as hostage, and entrusted Jinlong and Jinfeng to her care. When Ah Jin realised there was no chance for him to escape, he committed suicide.

1995
After Ah Jin's suicide, the area where Xiao-gu lived in was being redeveloped, and Xiao-gu, along with her family, moved to another area to start anew. Years went by, and by 1995, Xiao-gu's Happy Restaurant became a reputable restaurant in Queenstown. Her five children have matured into adults. All of Xiao-gu's three children: Kaida, Kaiqi, and Kaijie, went to University. Kaida majored in medicine, Kaiqi majored in Mass Communication, and Kaijie (despite his poor grades during his childhood) majored in Law. Meanwhile, Ah Jin's children are a different story. Jinlong did not receive much education, and worked in Happy Restaurant as a delivery boy. Jinfeng worked as a receptionist at the Happy Restaurant, but her dreams of being a television artiste virtually locked her in front of a television set, rendering her unproductive.

Tensions within
All seems to be going well for Xiao-gu, but under the surface, arguments arise. Jinlong resents the entire Huang family because he believes Xiao-gu married Ah Jin for his loot, and that Xiao-gu's family is responsible for his father's death. This became a source of argument between Jinlong and Kaijie, with whom he was never on cordial terms with. Meanwhile, Kaijie developed an interest for Jinfeng, but due to the source of tension between the two families, he cannot make his feelings public.

Love and conflict
One day, a woman came into the Happy Restaurant, and ordered everything there is on the menu. The woman turned out to be Lin Fei, whose father, Lin Desheng, is a famous and prestigious lawyer in Singapore. Lin Fei did not have money to pay the bill, but Xiao-gu laughed off the entire matter, and told Lin Fei to come back when she has the cash. She paid off the bill before she left Happy Restaurant, and began a deep friendship with Xiao-gu, and fell in love with Jinlong at first sight. Jinlong did not reciprocate the love at first, but gradually began to warm up to Lin Fei.

During a visit by Jinlong of his grandfather, Jinlong discovered that his grandfather hired a young woman from Kelantan to run his bak kut teh business at a local marketplace. Bak Kut Girl, as she is known, is brute and rude, but this is merely a facade for a kind and caring interior. These relationships began to ferment, until a fateful yacht trip. During that trip, Kaijie attempted to soothe a distraught Jinfeng, who was dealing with a relatively recent pregnancy furore caused by Kaijie. Under much pressure to keep the unfortunate event secret due to her fledgling rise to become a television artiste, Jinfeng was taken onto a yacht owned by Lin Fei to unwind and relax. During the yacht trip, Jinfeng discovered Kaijie's motive for dating Lin Fei: to gain access to her billion-dollar trust fund, which will be freed to her when she is married. Jinfeng vowed to tell Lin Fei the truth, and this forced Kaijie to throw her overboard. No one on board the ship noticed until it was too late, and Jinfeng was in a Persistent Vegetative State when she was rescued by David and Kaiqi. This happened when Jinlong was in prison for assault, and Xiao-gu opted to not tell him until it was absolutely necessary.

Revelation, cover-up
When Jinlong was released from prison, Xiao-gu treated him to a big meal, before attempting to tell him the truth about Jinfeng. However, Jinfeng was dying at the hospital, and Jinlong was called to the hospital while he was out shopping with Bak Kut Mei. Jinfeng eventually died, along with her unborn child. Prior to the tragedy, Kaida discovered that Kaijie is responsible for Jinfeng’s death. It turned out that Jinfeng was using a camcorder when she was thrown overboard, and Kaijie, after discovering the camera had a recording of the incident on its tape, hid it in a clothing drawer.

Kaida covered up for his brother at first (by destroying the tape), but quickly, the stress and guilt that came with the coverup began to overwhelm Kaida. When Jinlong came across facts that made Jinfeng's death suspicious, Jinlong proceeded to pressure Kaida into telling the truth, which contributed to Kaida's mental meltdown. Kaida's mental instability led to his suspension as a doctor, and also led to the loss of his love interest, Simin, whose love was split between Kaida and another fellow doctor in the first place.

As Jinlong was alienated from the Huang family because of their perception that he was responsible for Kaida's insanity, he began to settle into an independent life. After he learned that his grandfather's latest gambling streak left him with a $100,000+ debt, Jinlong decided to enter the Triads to work off his grandfather's debt.

2003
Years passed, and by 2003, all of Xiao-gu's children were in their thirties. Kaiqi became a television journalist, and Kaijie became a police officer. Meanwhile, Kaida, who is still mentally unstable, worked at the Happy Restaurant for Xiao-gu, watching television for the entire time he was there- just like what Jinfeng did when she worked for Xiao-gu

One evening, Kaiqi was late for the usual family dinner that Xiao-gu had with her children. It turned out that Kaiqi, while doing an investigation into the triads, discovered that Jinlong was working for the Triads as an illegal bookie/prostitute operator, and that the triad member that Kaiqi was shadowing was, in fact, Jinlong's fellow member. Jinlong met with Kaiqi later to persuade her to drop the report. Kaiqi refused, but she stated that she will blur out the triad member's face. This marked the first time that Jinlong had any contact with Xiao-gu's family since his departure from the family, and into the Triads. Although Jinlong was still cold to Xiao-gu and Kaijie, Jinlong's receptive attitude toward Kaiqi remained the same, proven from the fact that as Kaiqi planned her wedding with David, Jinlong bought her a necklace.

Meanwhile, Lin Fei, ever wanting to meet Jinlong once again, even though she is in a relationship with Kaijie, decided to go search for Jinlong, even to the point of becoming a prostitute (albeit temporarily) to seek out Jinlong, much to the chagrin and displeasure of Kaijie. Jinlong, on the surface, did not care for Lin Fei, but deep inside, he knew that Lin Fei cannot be dragged into his criminal lifestyle, and that he had to repel Lin Fei.

Triad murder
In the Triad Underworld, however, many things are coming to a head. Jinlong's rival in the underworld, Old Monkey, was fighting with Jinlong for supremacy, and this culminated in a rooftop confrontation that ended in the accidental death of Old Monkey. Old Monkey's followers decided to testify against Jinlong in court to put him behind prison for a long time. However, at the last minute, a prestigious lawyer named Su Ma came to Jinlong's defence. Because of Su Ma's prestige within the legal community, it was obvious that Lin Fei was the one who retained Su Ma for Jinlong. Jinlong was subsequently found not guilty.

Climax
Meanwhile, Kaida began to recover from his mental instability, and this meant that Kaida is about to tell the truth about Jinfeng's murder years ago. Kaijie, determined to not let the truth get out, attempted to compromise Kaida's mental state, so that the truth never comes out. However, when Kaida was involved in a car accident, he finally told Jinlong the truth. Devastated by the news, and determined to exact revenge, Jinlong took up an earlier offer by a Triad elder to become the head of the Triads, thus paving the way for a showdown between Jinlong and Kaijie. This showdown cost Jinlong sight in his right eye, and also the life of Bak Kut Girl (whom he had just married), who had always vowed to be alongside Jinlong at all times, even following him into the Triads. 6 months later, Jinlong found out that Kaijie had killed Bak Kut Girl in cold blood, and left her body to decompose in the woods. Lin Fei told Kaijie that she knew the truth behind Jinfeng's murder, and that Kaijie married her only for money. She contemplated suicide, only to learn that she was pregnant with Kaijie's child.

Jinlong confronted Kaijie (who had quit from the police force and become a lawyer) in an old warehouse, where Kaida and Kaiqi were also present. Under the persuasion of Kaida and Kaiqi, Jinlong decided not to kill Kaijie. Jinlong later collected Bak Kut Girl's ashes, scattered them over the ocean, and then committed suicide (ironically, in the same manner that Jinlong's father, Ah Jin, did when he was surrounded by police years ago). As for Kaijie, his criminal deeds were discovered by the police (through a handwritten note found on Bak Kut Girl's body linking him to her murder), thus forcing him to flee from the country.

2006
Three years later, Xiao-gu, mindful of the predicaments her children have ended up in, decided to sell all her businesses, donate the proceeds to charity, and restart Happy Restaurant at another place. Kaiqi now has a daughter, and Kaida returned to work at the hospital.

While all family members began their new phase of life, Kaijie, still fleeing from the law, called his mother for the last time, moments before he was killed by an unknown assassin (disguised as a bellboy) at a hotel. Just before the end credits, Lin Fei was seen with a young boy, most probably the child she had with Kaijie.

CD/DVD release
The Golden Path was released on CD/DVD in 2008 and is sold at some TS Stores Outlets -.

Viewership Rating
This drama serial had recorded the highest viewership rating for Year 2007.

Awards & Nominations
Although The Little Nyonya dominated the awards as expected, The Golden Path still managed a number of nominations. Veteran actress Chen Liping had the rare honour of being nominated twice for the same award for two different dramas she starred in that year. The Best Theme Songs and Best Drama nominated are Yi Xun 亦迅 — Just in Singapore 一房半厅一水缸 (《屋檐》)
, Daren Tan 陈轩昱 — Crime Busters x 2 叮当神探 (《幻听》)
, Chew Sin Huey 石欣卉 — Perfect Cut 一切完美 (《我知道我变漂亮了》)
, Mi Lu Bing 迷路兵 — The Golden Path 黄金路 (《路》)
& Cavin Soh 苏智诚 — Love Blossoms 心花朵朵开 (《心花朵朵开》)

Star Awards 2009

References

External links
Official website
Theme song
Channel 8 webpage (English)
Channel 8 webpage (Chinese)

Singapore Chinese dramas
2007 Singaporean television series debuts
2008 Singaporean television series endings
Channel 8 (Singapore) original programming
Triad (organized crime)